Wallace Evelyn "Wally" Stuttaford was a Rhodesian politician. He was a member of the National Assembly of Zimbabwe from the Republican Front.

Career 
In December 1981 was accused of being a South African agent, arrested, and tortured, generating anger among White Zimbabweans. He was re-arrested in 1982. He successfully sued the state for compensation.

References 

Year of birth missing
20th-century Zimbabwean politicians
Members of the National Assembly of Zimbabwe
Members of the Parliament of Rhodesia
People from Bulawayo
Republican Front politicians
Rhodesian Front politicians
White Zimbabwean politicians
Zimbabwean torture victims